Nicholas Julian Mayhew (Nick Mayhew) is Emeritus Professor of Numismatics and Monetary History, at the Ashmolean Museum, specialising in British and European medieval monetary history and numismatics. He was formerly Deputy Director (Collections) at the Ashmolean Museum.

Awards and honours 
 1995 - Jeton de Vermeil - awarded by the Société française de numismatique
 2002 - Medal of the Royal Numismatic Society
 2015 - Money, Prices and Wages: Essays in Honour of Professor Nicholas Mayhew, ed. by Martin Allen and D’Maris Coffman (Palgrave Macmillan, 2015).

Publications 
 1988 - Coinage in France from the Dark Ages to Napoleon (Seaby)
 1997 - The gros tournois : proceedings of the Fourteenth Oxford Symposium on Coinage and Monetary History Royal Numismatic Society Special Publication 31.
 1999 - Sterling: the rise and fall of a currency (Allen Lane, Penguin)
 2006 - Changing Values in Medieval Scotland: A study of prices, money, and weights and measures, with Elizabeth Gemmill (CUP).
 2008 - "Research in English museums : university and regional museums", in Görel Cavalli-Björkman and Svante Lindqvist (eds), Research and Museums: Proceedings of an International Symposium in Stockholm 22–25 May 2007, pp. 148–159.

References

External links 
 Mayhew's staff page at St Cross, Oxford
 Mayhew on worldcat

Year of birth missing (living people)
Living people
British numismatists
People associated with the Ashmolean Museum
Place of birth missing (living people)
Presidents of the Royal Numismatic Society